A cardboard boat race, sometimes known as a boat regatta, is a popular construction competition for people of all ages, with target audiences for competitions ranging from elementary-school students to college students and adults.

The earliest documented cardboard boat regatta was a class assignment created by Richard Archer at Southern Illinois University in 1974, and since then, the practice has only expanded, with an "International Cardboard Boat Regatta" occurring annually in New Richmond, Ohio.

According to an article published in the Middle School Journal, cardboard boat racing can be used as a way to get students interested in STEM fields by approaching an engineering challenge with "hands-on" learning.

Boat Construction and Competition Rules 
In a typical competition, competitors have to construct a boat under a fixed limit using only corrugated cardboard, glue, sheets, duct tape, and/or paint, although materials vary by competition. Some competitions are even more limiting, such as the New Richmond Annual Cardboard Boat Regatta, which only allows paint for waterproofing, and duct tape for construction, explicitly banning the use of glue or sheets.

Once teams have finished their boats, they race against one another, usually in a shallow pond, swimming pool, or river. The boats will almost always flood, sink, or shred under the weight however, mostly due to the difficulties of waterproofing cardboard.

In Rainy River, Ontario, races are held in two divisions each year with simple rules:
 Purist Classes: Team registration includes a supply of all materials used for boat construction. Contestants must build the boats and compete the same day.
 Open Classes: Boats can be constructed prior to Race Day using cardboard, duct tape, and additional adhesive components of the contestants' choosing. Suitably themed and costumed participants are encouraged to enter their creations in the Railroad Daze Parade.

Cardboard Boat Museum 
New Richmond, Ohio, is home to the world's "only cardboard boat museum". Based out of the town's "Springer House," the museum has been hosting the town's annual cardboard boat racing regatta since 1992. The museum is also the home to "Team Lemon," a team of experienced cardboard boat racers that support the museum.

The annual regatta takes place off the town's riverbank on the Ohio River and attracts "thousands of spectators" each year. The race is made up of a series of 14 heats and includes different categories for competitors of various age groups.

See also 
 Concrete canoe

References 
Model boats

External links 
Lake Anne Cardboard Boat Regatta - Reston Historic Trust & Museum
Pirate Fest- Las Vegas, Pirate Fest Las Vegas' Cardboard Regatta is sponsored by Zappos*The Great Beaver Boat Races Railroad Daze Rainy River, Ontario
Erie, Pennsylvania's first-ever Cardboard Boat Regatta
Cardboard Boat Races at Champney's West NL, racing cardboard boats in Trinity Bay Newfoundland.
Great Cardboard Boat Regatta(R), which claims its 1974 founding race to be the first ever cardboard boat regatta.
Cardboard Boat Race at McDonogh School
Cardboard Boat race in Medford, Oregon
Article about the Cardboard Boat Regatta in Stafford, Va.
Cardboard Boat Regatta in Stafford, Va.
The Cardboard Boat Book - The first book on how to build a cardboard boat
CardboardCrew - All about cardboard races in Knoxville, TN
Soap Kayak Race - Gara con canoe di cartone in Italy the longest cardboard boat regatta into the world
Bathtub Derby Cardboard Boat race - St Maarten, Kimsha Beach annual boat race
Go Fourth Festival Cardboard Boat Regatta in Longview, WA